Johnson graphs are a special class of undirected graphs defined from systems of sets. The vertices of the Johnson graph  are the -element subsets of an -element set; two vertices are adjacent when the intersection of the two vertices (subsets) contains -elements. Both Johnson graphs and the closely related Johnson scheme are named after Selmer M. Johnson.

Special cases
 is the complete graph .
 is the octahedral graph.
More generally, for all , the Johnson graph  is the complement of the Kneser graph

Graph-theoretic properties
  is isomorphic to 

 For all , any pair of vertices at distance  share  elements in common.

  is Hamilton-connected, meaning that every pair of vertices forms the endpoints of a Hamiltonian path in the graph. In particular this means that it has a Hamiltonian cycle.

 It is also known that the Johnson graph  is-vertex-connected. 

  forms the graph of vertices and edges of an (n − 1)-dimensional polytope, called a hypersimplex. 

Automorphism group 
In fact, unless ; otherwise, .

Intersection array 
As a consequence of being distance-transitive,  is also distance-regular.

 

where:

Eigenvalues and Eigenvectors 

where 

 The eigenvectors of  have an explicit description.

Johnson scheme
The Johnson graph  is closely related to the Johnson scheme, an association scheme in which each pair of -element sets is associated with a number, half the size of the symmetric difference of the two sets. The Johnson graph has an edge for every pair of sets at distance one in the association scheme, and the distances in the association scheme are exactly the shortest path distances in the Johnson graph.

The Johnson scheme is also related to another family of distance-transitive graphs, the odd graphs, whose vertices are -element subsets of an -element set and whose edges correspond to disjoint pairs of subsets.

Open Problems 
The vertex-expansion properties of Johnson graphs, as well as the structure of the corresponding extremal sets of vertices of a given size, are not fully understood. However, an asymptotically tight lower-bound on expansion of large sets of vertices was recently obtained.

In general, determining the chromatic number of a Johnson graph is an open problem.

See also
 Grassmann graph

References

External links

Parametric families of graphs
Regular graphs